In ontology and the philosophy of mind, a non-physical entity is an object that exists outside physical reality. The philosophical schools of idealism and dualism assert that such entities exist, while physicalism asserts that they do not. Positing the existence of non-physical entities leads to further questions concerning their inherent nature and their relation to physical entities.

Abstract concepts

Philosophers generally do agree on the existence of abstract objects. The mind can conceive of objects that clearly have no physical counterpart.  Such objects include concepts such as numbers, mathematical sets and functions, and philosophical relations and properties.  If such objects are indeed entities, they are entities that exist only in the mind itself, not within space and time.  For an example, an abstract property such as redness has no presence in space-time. To make a distinction between metaphysics and epistemology, such objects, if they are to be considered entities, are categorized as logical entities to distinguish them from physical entities.  The study of non-physical entities can be summarized by the question, "Is imagination real?"
While older Cartesian dualists held the existence of non-physical minds, more limited forms of dualism propounded by 20th and 21st century philosophers (such as property dualism) hold merely the existence of non-physical properties.

Mind–body dualism

Dualism is the division of two contrasted or opposed aspects. The dualist school supposes the existence of non-physical entities, the most widely discussed one being the mind. But beyond that it runs into stumbling blocks. Pierre Gassendi put one such problem directly to René Descartes in 1641, in response to Descartes's Meditations:

Descartes' response to Gassendi, and to Princess Elizabeth who asked him similar questions in 1643, is generally considered nowadays to be lacking, because it did not address what is known in the philosophy of mind as the interaction problem. This is a problem for non-physical entities as posited by dualism: by what mechanism, exactly, do they interact with physical entities, and how can they do so? Interaction with physical systems requires physical properties which a non-physical entity does not possess.

Dualists either, like Descartes, avoid the problem by considering it impossible for a non-physical mind to conceive the relationship that it has with the physical, and so impossible to explain philosophically, or assert that the questioner has made the fundamental mistake of thinking that the distinction between the physical and the non-physical is such that it prevents each from affecting the other.

Other questions about the non-physical which dualism has not answered include such questions as how many minds each person can have, which is not an issue for physicalism which can simply declare one-mind-per-person almost by definition; and whether non-physical entities such as minds and souls are simple or compound, and if the latter, what "stuff" the compounds are made from.

Spirits 

Describing in philosophical terms what a non-physical entity actually is (or would be) can prove problematic. A convenient example of what constitutes a non-physical entity is a ghost. Gilbert Ryle once labelled Cartesian dualism as positing the "ghost in the machine".  However, it is hard to define in philosophical terms what it is, precisely, about a ghost that makes it a specifically non-physical, rather than a physical entity. Were the existence of ghosts ever demonstrated beyond doubt, it has been claimed that would actually place them in the category of physical entities.

Purported non-mental non-physical entities include things such as gods, angels, demons, and ghosts. Lacking physical demonstrations of their existence, their existences and natures are widely debated, independently of the philosophy of mind.

See also
 Ascended master
 Mythology of Stargate#Ancients

References

Further reading 
 
 
 
 
 
 
 
 
 
 
 
 
 

Concepts in metaphysics
Ontology